Jeronim Vidulić  (around 1430 – 1499 in Zadar) was a 15th-century Catholic priest and notary from Zadar, Venetian Dalmatia (today Croatia). He is best known for recording one of the earliest Petrarchist poems in Croatian, written using Glagolitic script.

Biography
He lived in the 15th century in the city of Zadar. He belonged to civilian family. He was a priest, but has been also mentioned (1456) as a notary for the city and the county of Zadar. He died in 1499.

Work
The only preserved - though in a bit damaged state - Vidulić's poem in Croatian, Ako mi ne daš lik, composed in six dodecasyllabic quatrains, is the proof of the existence of troubadour-Petrarchan school of poetry in the middle of 15th century in Zadar, beside the city of Dubrovnik. The poem was found written on one official document and, of course, it is not certain whether Vidulić was the author or just a scribe. Vidulić was also an educated humanist, used Glagolitic script, and was in a certain way a predecessor of Petar Zoranić.

References

Further reading 
 V. Valčić, »Jerolim Vidulić. najstariji hrvatski pjesnik Zadra«, Zbornik Instituta za historijske nauke u Zadru (1955),

15th-century Croatian poets
Writers from Zadar
1499 deaths
Year of birth unknown
Croatian male poets
Year of birth uncertain